Oleg Aleksandrovich Zhestkov (born 20 January 1987) is a Russian sprint canoeist who competes in the four-man K-4 1000 m event. He won the world title in 2013, placing third in 2011, and had a silver medal at the 2016 European Championships. His teams finished seventh at the 2012 and ninth at the 2016 Olympics.

In March 2019 Zhestkov tested positive for the banned substance EPO, receiving a four-year ban.

Zhestkov was born in Omsk, but later moved to Krasnodar. He took up kayaking following his two brothers, his mother and his cousin.

References

Russian male canoeists
1987 births
Living people
Olympic canoeists of Russia
Canoeists at the 2012 Summer Olympics
Canoeists at the 2016 Summer Olympics
ICF Canoe Sprint World Championships medalists in kayak
Canoeists at the 2015 European Games
European Games competitors for Russia
Doping cases in canoeing
Universiade medalists in canoeing
Universiade gold medalists for Russia
Medalists at the 2013 Summer Universiade